Thomas Henyey is an American earth scientist and son of American astronomer Louis G. Henyey. Henyey is the former director of the Southern California Earthquake Center at the University of Southern California in Los Angeles, California.

References

University of Southern California people
California Institute of Technology people
Southern California Earthquake Center
1941 births
American earth scientists
Living people